Raymond Leo Burke (born June 30, 1948) is an American prelate of the Catholic Church. A bishop, cardinal, and the incumbent patron of the Sovereign Military Order of Malta, he led the Archdiocese of St. Louis from 2004 to 2008 and the Diocese of La Crosse from 1995 to 2004. From June 2008 to November 2014, he was the prefect of the Supreme Tribunal of the Apostolic Signatura.

A canon lawyer, Burke is often perceived as a voice of traditionalism among prelates of the Catholic Church. He established a reputation as a conservative leader while serving in La Crosse and St. Louis. Burke is a major proponent of the Tridentine Mass, having frequently officiated it and conferred ordinations on traditionalist priests. He has criticized what he sees as deficiencies in the post-1969 Mass of Paul VI. He is frequently seen as a de facto leader of the church's conservative wing.

Burke has publicly clashed with Pope Francis, vigorously opposing attempts by other bishops to relax church attitudes towards gay people and those Catholics who have divorced and remarried outside the church. Burke has opined that Catholic politicians who support legalized abortion, including presidential candidate John Kerry and President Joe Biden, should not receive the Eucharist. While Burke has denied allegations of disloyalty to Pope Francis, a number of Burke's statements have been interpreted as criticisms, once mentioning the possible need to "formally correct" the pope in relation to Amoris laetitia. This has led to a backlash from some Catholics towards Burke.

In September 2015, the Vatican announced that Burke had been reappointed to the Congregation for the Causes of Saints, from which he had been removed in December 2013, but not to his more influential positions on the Congregation for Bishops and the Apostolic Signatura. In 2016, he was not reappointed as a member of the Congregation for Divine Worship. In February 2017, Burke was again sidelined when Pope Francis appointed Archbishop Giovanni Angelo Becciu as his special delegate to the Sovereign Military Order of Malta, with exclusive responsibility for the duties which would normally be exercised by Burke as its patron. Albrecht von Boeselager, the order's grand chancellor, announced that this meant Burke was "de facto suspended" from the patronage. Pope Francis reappointed him as a rank-and-file member of the Apostolic Signatura in September 2017.

Early life
Burke was born on June 30, 1948, in Richland Center, Wisconsin, the youngest of the six children of Thomas F. and Marie B. Burke. He is of Irish heritage with ancestors from Cork and Tipperary. Burke attended St. Mary's Parish School in Richland Center from 1954 to 1959. (In 2012, an addition to the school was named the Raymond Cardinal Burke Annex in his honor.) The family later moved to Stratford, Wisconsin. From 1962 to 1968, he attended Holy Cross Seminary in La Crosse, Wisconsin. From 1968 to 1971, he studied at the Catholic University of America in Washington, D.C., as a Basselin scholar, receiving a Bachelor of Arts degree in 1970 and a Master of Arts degree in 1971, both in philosophy. He completed studies for the priesthood at the Pontifical Gregorian University in Rome between 1971 and 1975, receiving a Bachelor of Sacred Theology degree and a Master of Arts degree. Pope Paul VI ordained Burke to the priesthood on June 29, 1975, in St. Peter's Basilica.

Priestly ministry
After his ordination to the priesthood, Burke was assigned as assistant rector of the Cathedral of St. Joseph the Workman in La Crosse, Wisconsin. He also taught religion at Aquinas High School in La Crosse (where a new addition was named the Bishop Burke Hall in his honor in 1997 and then in 2011 was renamed the Cardinal Burke Hall). From 1980 to 1984, Burke studied canon law at the Pontifical Gregorian University in Rome, where he received a licentiate in canon law in 1982 and a doctorate in canon law in 1984. He then returned to La Crosse where he was named the Moderator of the Curia and Vice Chancellor of the La Crosse diocese. In 1989, Pope John Paul II named Burke the first American Defender of the Bond of the Supreme Tribunal of the Apostolic Signatura, the highest ecclesiastical court in the Catholic Church.

Episcopal ministry

Bishop of La Crosse
On December 10, 1994, Pope John Paul II named Burke Bishop of the Diocese of La Crosse and consecrated him on January 6, 1995, in St. Peter's Basilica. Burke took possession of the See of La Crosse on February 22, 1995.

In 2000, Burke convened the fifth diocesan synod for the Diocese of La Crosse, which resulted in the publication of Synod V, acts: celebrated June 11–14, 2000 in 2003. In 2002, he was influential in founding the Canons Regular of the New Jerusalem, an order of Augustinian canons dedicated to the Tridentine Mass, the traditional form of the liturgy in the Latin Church.

Two anonymous priests in the Diocese of La Crosse said that Burke's leadership was imperfect. Many of his actions alienated some. One such example was the construction of the $25 million Shrine of Our Lady of Guadalupe, patroness of the Americas, with some saying that the money used should have gone to the poor, while Burke defended the move as a fruitful way to raise spiritual devotion. Another was the diocese's withdrawal from Church World Service's annual Crop Walk because some of the money raised was being used to purchase condoms in developing countries. Burke also welcomed numerous traditional orders, including the Institute of Christ the King Sovereign Priest (ICKSP), whose priests offer exclusively the Tridentine Mass, to his diocese. Two priests left the diocese as a result of his policies. Burke closed a number of schools while also raising teachers' salaries. His style was noted by some of his aides to be more formal than that of his predecessor, John Joseph Paul, although his aides described him as warm and approachable in private. During his tenure, the diocese continued to participate in charitable efforts while also increasing its moral and political activism.

Archbishop of St. Louis

On December 2, 2003, Burke was named Archbishop of St. Louis, succeeding Cardinal Justin Francis Rigali, who had been appointed Archbishop of Philadelphia. He was installed on January 26, 2004, and was presented with the pallium on June 29, 2004, by Pope John Paul II. In St. Louis, Burke emphasized the promotion of vocations to the priesthood. He also published a column in the archdiocesan weekly newspaper, the Saint Louis Review. In both La Crosse and St. Louis, Burke established oratories for those desiring to worship according to the traditional form. As he had done in La Crosse, he invited the Institute of Christ the King into his diocese and ordained priests for the group both in the U.S. and abroad. His ordination of two ICKSP priests on June 15, 2007, in a Solemn Pontifical High Mass marked the first time in 40 years that the Tridentine rite of ordination had been used in the Cathedral Basilica of St. Louis. In 2006, when Missouri voters narrowly approved an amendment to the state constitution permitting embryonic stem cell research, he said it meant that "our tiniest brothers and sisters ... will be made legally the subjects, the slaves, of those who wish to manipulate and destroy their lives for the sake of supposed scientific and technological progress."

During his tenure, Burke escalated a long-running dispute over the attempted closing of a church in the diocese, St. Stanislaus Kostka Church, and the ownership of its significant assets. After Father Marek Bozek led a Christmas Eve Mass in 2005 despite the archdiocese's previous attempted closure of the parish, Burke "declare[d] that the church was in 'schism'", a designation that led to the excommunication of Bozek and the church's lay board. In 2012, a state court ruled against the diocese and sided with the congregation, now an independent Catholic church, and awarded it full ownership of the significant parish assets.

In July 2006, Benedict XVI appointed Burke a member of the Supreme Tribunal of the Apostolic Signatura, the highest court in the Catholic Church. On May 6, 2008, Pope Benedict XVI gave Burke two Vatican assignments. He was named a member of the Pontifical Council for Legislative Texts, which interprets canon law, and a member of the Congregation for the Clergy.

Prefect of the Apostolic Signatura
On June 27, 2008, Pope Benedict XVI appointed Burke Prefect of the Supreme Tribunal of the Apostolic Signatura. Burke was appointed a member of several dicasteries of the Roman Curia: on May 6, 2008, of the Pontifical Council for Legislative Texts, which authoritatively interprets canon law, and of the Congregation for the Clergy, which regulates the formation and training of diocesan priests and deacons; on October 17, 2009, of the Congregation for Bishops, which oversees the appointment of most Latin Church bishops outside mission territories; on July 6, 2010, of the Congregation for Divine Worship and the Discipline of the Sacraments; on July 24, 2010, of the Congregation for the Causes of Saints; and on January 29, 2011, of the Council of Cardinals and Bishops of the Section for Relations with States of the Secretariat of State. On October 7, 2008, Burke was appointed President of the Commission for Advocates, which is responsible for admitting qualified canon lawyers to a registry of those who may practice in the Vatican's courts.

On March 11, 2010, in the wake of the sexual abuse scandal that had come to light in Europe, Burke said that the Vatican needed to prepare a document that outlined a set of explicit guidelines rooted in Canon Law that would guide bishops and their local tribunals worldwide in determining how to report the cases to the Holy See, so as to speed up the process by which justice is done for the victims. Changes would also be made to a policy that provided for high levels of secrecy in the process.

College of Cardinals

On November 20, 2010, Pope Benedict XVI made Burke Cardinal-Deacon of Sant'Agata dei Goti, the fifth Archbishop of St. Louis to become a member of the College of Cardinals. On February 5, 2011, the memorial of Saint Agatha, Burke took canonical possession of his titular church in Rome.

In October 2012, Burke was appointed the President of the Commission for Controversies at the 13th Ordinary General Assembly of the Synod of Bishops.

Burke was one of the cardinal electors who participated in the 2013 papal conclave that elected Pope Francis.

On December 16, 2013, Pope Francis made extensive changes to the Congregation for Bishops, the influential Vatican department that oversees the selection and assignment of bishops, and Burke was not reappointed a member. Some speculated this reflected the fact that Burke takes "a more aggressive line than the pope on the Western culture wars". According to Archbishop and former apostolic nuncio to the United States Carlo Maria Viganò, Burke's removal happened due to the influence of Cardinal Theodore McCarrick, Archbishop Emeritus of Washington, but Viganò's interpretation has not been independently verified.

After ten years at the rank of cardinal deacon, Burke exercised his option to assume the rank of cardinal priest, which Pope Francis confirmed on May 3, 2021.

Apostolic Signatura and Patron of the Sovereign Military Order of Malta
On November 4, 2014, Burke publicly complained that "There is a strong sense that the church is like a ship without a rudder." He balanced his critique by stating that he did not want to be interpreted as criticizing the pope.

On November 8, four days later, Pope Francis removed Burke as prefect of the Apostolic Signatura and named him Patron of the Sovereign Military Order of Malta, a largely ceremonial post usually given to a retired cardinal or as a secondary job to an active one.

Many perceived Burke's dismissal as related to his "rudderless ship" comment. Pope Francis denied that removing Burke as head of the Vatican's highest court was a "punishment" for his outspoken conservative views at the 2014 Synod on the Family, saying that he wanted a "smart American" to serve as patron of the Order of Malta. The pontiff said that the move was part of a broader restructuring of the Vatican bureaucracy that had been decided well before the synod, but he had waited until after the synod to make it official so Burke could still participate in the meeting as the head of a Vatican department.

Myanmar condom controversy
In spite of the usually ceremonial nature of his new position, trouble surfaced for Burke by early 2017 after it was revealed that he and then Knights of Malta Grand Master Matthew Festing had worked to oust Chancellor Albrecht Freiherr von Boeselager for supplying condoms to people in Myanmar in contradiction to official Catholic teaching, which prohibits artificial contraception. On February 2, 2017, Pope Francis sidelined Burke as the Patron of the Sovereign Military Order of Malta by appointing Archbishop Giovanni Angelo Becciu as his special delegate to the order with exclusive responsibility for the duties normally exercised by the Patron. On February 21, Albrecht von Boeselager, the order's grand chancellor, announced that this meant Burke was "de facto suspended" from the patronage.

Other service in the Roman Curia
On September 26, 2015, Pope Francis named him a member of the Congregation for the Causes of Saints.

In November 2016, Pope Francis removed Burke from the membership of the Congregation for Divine Worship. This was seen to be in response to the dubia (Latin for doubts) submitted by him, together with three other cardinals, to elements of Amoris laetitia which appear to them to be at odds with Catholic moral teaching, notably with regard to the treatment of divorced persons. Burke had indicated that in the absence of a response to the dubia a “formal correction” of Pope Francis would probably follow.

Beginning in February 2017, Burke was transferred to Guam to preside over a five-judge panel at the church trial of Archbishop Anthony Sablan Apuron of Agaña on charges of sexual abuse of minors. In March 2018, the court found Apuron guilty and ordered that he be removed from office.

On September 30, 2017, Francis reappointed him a member of the Supreme Tribunal of the Apostolic Signatura. He assumed the position of a rank and file member, and did not regain his earlier position as prefect.

Other
Burke previously chaired the advisory board of the Institute for Human Dignity, a Catholic-inspired non-governmental organization based in Rome. Burke terminated his relationship with the institute in June 2019 amid its being identified increasingly publicly with the political program of Steve Bannon.

He became the leader of the Holy League, officially launched on March 7, 2015, on the 444th anniversary of the Holy League called by Pope Pius V against the Ottoman empire in 1571. The modern Holy League describes itself as a parish-based network of men united in devotion to the Blessed Sacrament.

Views

Comments on Pope Francis and criticism
Burke is widely viewed as a leader of the conservative wing of the church, and de facto leader in the United States to those that oppose the reforms under Pope Francis. Shortly after Pope Francis did not reappoint him to the Congregation of Bishops, Burke said, "One gets the impression, or it's interpreted this way in the media, that he thinks we're talking too much about abortion, too much about the integrity of marriage as between one man and one woman. But we can never talk enough about that."

Burke has denied media perceptions that the Pope planned to change the Catholic Church's teaching on moral issues. He said that people "hardened against the truth" would claim that the Pope wants to change church teachings that today's secularized culture rejects. He also said "their false praise of the Holy Father’s approach mocks the fact that he is the Successor of Saint Peter", and that he consequently "rejects the acceptance and praise of the world". Pope Francis spoke favorably of Burke in 2017, saying, "I do not see Cardinal Burke as an enemy." He also called Burke "an excellent lawyer."

In an interview with The Wanderer on January 10, 2019, Burke denounced Pope Francis's September 2018 Holy See–China Agreement. He said that it was "in effect ... a repudiation of generations of martyrs and confessors of the Faith in China." Burke also criticized the notion of "synodality", in which authority is removed from the pope and placed in the hands of bishops. "In listening to the Pope, one is given the impression that he is giving more and more authority to individual bishops and Conferences of Bishops. But this is not the Catholic Church", Burke said. He accused promoters of synodality of attempting to affect a "revolution" in the church, the end of which would result in Catholicism being practiced differently in various countries, to the overall detriment of the church.

Burke's perceived status as an ultra-conservative and opponent of Pope Francis has led to criticism. Some bishops have refused to allow him to host conferences in their dioceses, and a number of priests have protested against him "and accuse him of spreading propaganda against the Pope." The National Catholic Reporter published a highly critical editorial about Burke in July 2019, castigating him as "the modern version of that religious leader that drew some of Jesus' harshest condemnations, those who placed undue burdens on others and pronounced themselves the undisputed bearers of truth." It rebuked him for allegedly wanting to "reconstitute the clericalism that is at the heart of the sex abuse cover-up scandal that continues to undermine the authority of the church," and for attempting "to replace the dynamism of Francis' model of accompaniment with a return to a statute-bound and static institution in service of itself."

On June 10, 2019, Burke, Cardinal Jānis Pujats, and Kazakh bishops Tomasz Peta, Jan Paul Lenga, and Athanasius Schneider published a 40-point "Declaration of Truths" claiming to reaffirm traditional church teaching. The bishops wrote that such a declaration was necessary in a time of "almost universal doctrinal confusion and disorientation." Specific passages in the declaration implicitly related to several writings by Pope Francis, and some of them were seen as criticism or even opposition. The declaration states that "the religion born of faith in Jesus Christ" is the "only religion positively willed by God," seemingly alluding to the Document on Human Fraternity signed by Pope Francis on February 4, which stated that the "diversity of religions" is "willed by God." Following recent changes to the Catechism of the Catholic Church to oppose capital punishment, the declaration states that the church "did not err" in teaching that civil authorities may "lawfully exercise capital punishment" when it is "truly necessary" to preserve the "just order of societies".

In September 2019, Burke and Schneider published an 8-page letter denouncing what they alleged to be six theological errors in the working document for the Synod of Bishops for the Pan-Amazon region and asking that Pope Francis "confirm his brethren in the faith by an unambiguous rejection of the errors." Burke and Schneider criticized the document for its "implicit pantheism," support for married clergy and a greater role for women in the liturgy, and for what they considered to be excessive openness to pagan rituals and practices common among the Amazonian peoples. They asked that the laity and the clergy pray at least one decade of the Rosary and fast weekly for the rejection of such ideas over a 40-day period, from September 17 to October 26.

Abortion and embryonic stem-cell research
During the 2004 presidential election, Burke stated that he would not give communion to John Kerry or other Catholic politicians who publicly support legalized abortion. "One of the problems I have is bishops who say to me, 'Well, this is unheard of in the church's practice.' Actually it goes back to St. Paul in the (First) Letter to the Corinthians, when he says: The person who eats and drinks the body and blood of Christ unworthily eats and drinks condemnation unto himself," he said. He also wrote a pastoral letter saying Catholics should not vote for politicians who support abortion or other "anti-life" practices. Burke later clarified his position, stating that one could vote for a pro-abortion politician and not commit a mortal sin, if one believed there was a more significant moral issue than abortion at hand, but he also stated that he could not think of any sort of issue that would qualify. In a September 2008 interview, Burke said that "the Democratic Party risks transforming itself definitively into a 'party of death', because of its choices on bioethical questions", especially elective abortion.

In 2008, Burke urged Saint Louis University to take disciplinary action against its head basketball coach, Rick Majerus, after Majerus publicly supported abortion and embryonic stem cell research at a campaign event for Democratic Senator and presidential candidate Hillary Clinton. Burke stated: "When you take a position in a Catholic university, you don't have to embrace everything the Catholic Church teaches. But you can't make statements which call into question the identity and mission of the Catholic Church." Saint Louis University supported Majerus's right to publicly expound on his own personal views when made at an event he did not attend as a university representative.

In March 2009, Burke called on American bishops to withhold the Eucharist from Catholic politicians who support legalized abortion. The bishops' failure to do so, Burke said, "is weakening the faith of everyone. It's giving the impression that it must be morally correct to support procured abortion." He also said that any president who promotes and implements "anti-life" legislation could be an "agent of death". Burke later said that he made his remarks not as Prefect of the Apostolic Signatura, head of the Vatican's highest court, but simply as an American bishop. Two months later in May, Burke stated, "Since President [Barack] Obama clearly announced, during the election campaign, his anti-life and anti-family agenda, a Catholic who knew his agenda regarding, for example, procured abortion, embryonic-stem-cell research, and same-sex marriage, could not have voted for him with a clear conscience." During the election, Obama had not officially called for same-sex marriage, but had advocated same-sex civil unions.

In February 2013 Burke commented on the Irish abortion debate, stating that, in accordance with canon law, priests should exclude politicians who support abortion from receiving the Eucharist. Burke has stated that not simply politicians but anyone who supports abortion cannot receive Holy Communion. "I can't imagine that any Catholic wouldn't know that abortion is a grievous sin, but if they don't, once they’ve been told, then they either have to cease to support abortion or accept the fact they are not a Catholic in good standing and therefore should not present themselves for Holy Communion," he said.

When Sheryl Crow, who advocates for embryonic stem-cell research, was scheduled to perform at a benefit concert for the Cardinal Glennon Children's Hospital, Burke stated that to have the hospital host Crow would give "the impression that the Church is somehow inconsistent in its teaching." He asked that her invitation be privately removed and resigned from the board on April 25, 2007, when Crow's performance was confirmed.

Burke said that Donald Trump's victory in the 2016 United States presidential election was a win for anti-abortion causes.

In an August 2019 interview, Burke criticized people who consider themselves members of the church but disagree with its teaching on certain issues. "I've had non-Catholic leaders of government in this nation tell me that they were certain that the Catholic teaching on abortion and so-called same-sex marriage have changed because so many Catholics on Capitol Hill are regularly supporting this kind of legislation. And that's a scandal," he said. Singling out Joe Biden, he told such people not to attempt to receive Holy Communion. "It's not a punishment. It's actually a favor to these people to tell them don't approach, Burke said, "because if they approach, they commit sacrilege." Burke denounced Kamala Harris for her criticisms of Judge Brian Buescher and his affiliation with the Knights of Columbus, saying that people "need to look at that kind of statement for what it is and say this isn't a person who I want to be the leader of my nation."

Role of women in the church and priest shortage
In June 2008, Burke as the Archbishop of Saint Louis applied an interdict, which excludes a person from church ministries and the sacraments, to a Sister of Charity, Louise Lears, judging her guilty of three grave canonical offenses against the Catholic Church's faith and teachings. Lears, a pastoral worker and educator, had publicly stated her belief that all of the church's ministries, including the priesthood, should be open to women. Lears received the interdict after attending an ordination ceremony, which the church does not recognize, of a woman to the priesthood at a Jewish synagogue by the WomenPriests movement.

In January 2015, Burke gave an interview to an organization called the New  Project. The group was formed to confront what it calls a "man crisis" in the Catholic Church. In the interview, Burke is sympathetic to the group's concerns that men are being driven from the pews because of the "feminization" of the Catholic Church. Burke criticized what he saw as the excessive role of "radical feminism" in the church. He said that it has "assaulted the Church and society since the 1960s has left men very marginalized" and led the Church to deemphasize issues important to men, such as chivalry and sacrifice. In addition to decrying "radical feminism", he specifically criticized the introduction of female altar servers as an unwelcome sign of the "feminization" of the church and a disincentive to boys to serve at the altar and start on the path to ordination. "The introduction of girl servers also led many boys to abandon altar service", Burke said. "Young boys don't want to do things with girls. It’s just natural. The girls were also very good at altar service. So many boys drifted away over time." In another 2015 interview, Burke blamed pedophile priests on "radical feminism which has assaulted the Church and society since the 1960s."

Burke has said that it requires "certain manly discipline to serve as an altar boy in service at the side of a priest, and most priests have their first deep experiences of the liturgy as altar boys. If we are not training young men as altar boys, giving them an experience of serving God in the liturgy, we should not be surprised that vocations have fallen dramatically."

Opposition to homosexuality and same-sex marriage
Burke is a strong critic and opponent of moves to soften attitudes towards homosexuality and to permit greater acceptance of gay people within the church. In a 2013 interview, Burke said that same-sex marriage "is a work of deceit, a lie about the most fundamental aspect of our human nature, our human sexuality, which, after life itself, defines us. There is only one place these types of lies come from, namely Satan. It is a diabolical situation which is aimed at destroying individuals, families, and eventually our nation."

In an interview in October 2014, Burke referred to gay relationships as "profoundly disordered and harmful", stating that parents should not "expose [their] children to that." He suggested that parents should not allow their children to have contact with sexually active gay people and should discourage them from attending family gatherings such as celebrations at Christmas. He has described homosexuality as an "ailment" which is not genetic but largely depended on a person's environment. Shortly after he argued that Pope Francis had never said that positive elements could be found in homosexual acts, adding that it was "impossible to find positive elements in an evil act."

Speaking in Oxford after the May 2015 same-sex marriage referendum in Ireland, Burke said that he struggled to understand "any nation redefining marriage ... I mean, this is a defiance of God. It's just incredible. Pagans may have tolerated homosexual behaviours, they never dared to say this was marriage."  Archbishop Eamon Martin of Armagh distanced himself from Burke's remarks, urging individuals "to try to be respectful and inoffensive in language" wherever possible.

In August 2017, Burke said that Cardinal Reinhard Marx's assertion that Germany's recent legalization of same-sex marriage should not be a major concern for the Catholic Church there showed how the church lacked "the clarity and the courage to announce the Gospel of Life and Divine Love to the radically secularized culture". He alluded to diabolical errors spreading from society to Church leaders, raising concerns that the "end times" were nearing, and once again stating that homosexual acts were sinful. He insisted that the correct approach would distinguish between the love for the person and the hatred Catholics "must always have for sinful acts".

In 2019, Burke chastised some of his fellow bishops for their perceived failures in keeping church teaching. He believes there are "pressure groups" within the United States Conference of Catholic Bishops (USCCB) who have been attempting to soften the church's attitude on homosexuality, including trying to remove the description "intrinsically disordered" from the discussion of homosexual acts in the Catechism, a change which Burke said is "not possible." Burke went on, "There is definitely within the hierarchy of the United States an element which is not coherent with the Church on these issues." He then criticized prelates who "promote Fr. James Martin ... within their dioceses." He alleged that Martin "is not coherent with the Church's teaching on homosexuality" and said that such promotion is "an indication to us that there is a serious difficulty within the hierarchy that must be addressed."

In February 2019 Burke penned an open letter with Cardinal Walter Brandmuller addressed to Pope Francis calling for an end of "the plague of the homosexual agenda," which they blamed for the sexual abuse crisis engulfing the Catholic Church. They claimed the agenda was spread by "organized networks" protected by a "conspiracy of silence."

Divorce
Burke has opposed any hypothetical change of church doctrine that would permit civilly divorced Catholics who are validly married to remarry or receive the Eucharist once they have entered into a second civil marriage. In 2013 he co-authored a book with cardinals Gerhard Ludwig Müller and George Pell on the subject.

An interim document from the 2014 Synod of Bishops softened the Catholic Church's language on gay people, contraception and divorced and civilly remarried people. Burke said that the response showed that "a great number of the Synod Fathers found it objectionable." In an interview with Catholic World Report, Burke said the document "lacks a solid foundation in the Sacred Scriptures and the Magisterium (the teaching authority of the Catholic Church) and gives the impression of inventing a totally new, what one member of the Synod called 'revolutionary', teaching on marriage and the family." Burke went on to say, in an interview with BuzzFeed, that if "Pope Francis had selected certain cardinals to steer the meeting so as to advance his personal views on matters like divorce and the treatment of LGBT people", he would not be observing his mandate as the leader of the Catholic Church.

In an interview in the German daily Die Welt on April 24, 2015, concerning the Fourteenth Ordinary General Assembly of the Synod of Bishops, Burke renewed his criticism of German Cardinal Walter Kasper, whose "merciful" solution for remarried divorcees who wish to receive communion was discussed at the 2014 Extraordinary Synod. “We are bound by the Magisterium. But some Synod Fathers, above all Cardinal Kasper, want to change it. So I had to make myself very clear. Clashes at Synods, incidentally, are nothing unusual. Think of the early Councils, the Arian heresy, for instance, when Athanasius even became physically aggressive”, Burke recalled. He also mentioned that Pope John Paul II had ruled out women's ordination “once and for all”.

Burke, along with three other cardinals, issued a set of dubia, or doubts, to Pope Francis, asking him to clarify various points of doctrine in his 2016 apostolic exhortation, Amoris laetitia and on general Christian life. The other cardinals were Italian Carlo Caffarra and Germans Brandmüller and Joachim Meisner. Since the 2014 synod, some bishops had begun allowing Catholics who had been divorced and remarried to receive Holy Communion, despite the fact that such persons are traditionally said to be committing adultery and living in mortal sin and therefore ineligible to participate according to official church law. A footnote in Amoris laetitia was seen as allowing that under some circumstances. Burke said that if divorced and remarried Catholics were permitted to receive Holy Communion, "then the Church's teaching on marriage is finished."

The four cardinals submitted the dubia in private, followed by a public letter ("Seeking Clarity: A Plea to Untie the Knots in Amoris Laetitia") in November 2016, asking Francis to clarify various points of doctrine.  The first dubia asked about the reception of the sacraments by the divorced and remarried. The public letter asked about fundamental issues of the Christian life and referenced Pope John Paul II's encyclical Veritatis splendor. In April 2017, following no reply to their letter, the cardinals requested a meeting with Francis, but there has been no response to this request.

On April 7, 2018, Burke, along with Brandmüller and Schneider, participated in a conference rejecting the outline proposed by German bishops to allow divorced and remarried Catholics to receive the Eucharist. Citing chapter 19 of the Gospel of Matthew, he disputed the notion that anyone, including the pope, had the authority to accept divorced and remarried Catholics as full members of the church. During the conference, Burke expressed the belief that a "public correction" of a pope in error can take place after a private one has been ignored or rejected. "As a matter of duty, the pope can be disobeyed," Burke said. He added that "the Roman pontiff can dispense with the law only for the purpose of preserving its purpose, and never for subverting it."

In an interview on September 6, Burke said that he shared fellow dubia signatory Caffarra's "profound sadness" that the dubia never received a response, and wondered whether such sadness contributed to his death. "The dubia must have a response sooner or later," Burke said. "It’s a simple response: Yes or no. That’s all. It's not complicated."

Palliative care and euthanasia
At a July 23, 2011, conference on end-of-life care sponsored by the St. Gianna Physician's Guild, Burke said that suffering does not cause a person to have less meaning in his life, nor does it give the government the right to decide if that person should live or die: "No matter how much a life is diminished, no matter what suffering the person is undergoing, that life demands the greatest respect and care. It's never right to snuff out a life because it's in some way under heavy burden."

SSPX reintegration
In 2012, during negotiations between the traditionalist Society of Saint Pius X (SSPX), which is in a canonically irregular status with the Holy See, Burke expressed optimism that the Society's members would reconcile themselves with the Vatican. He referred to the Society's members as people who "have the Catholic faith and the love of the sacred liturgy." The talks eventually failed. In July 2017, Burke said that SSPX was "in schism" and that it was "not legitimate to attend Mass or to receive the sacraments in a church" of theirs, and that faithful Catholics should avoid SSPX liturgies. He criticized Pope Francis's openness towards SSPX, stating that "There is no canonical explanation for it, and it is simply an anomaly", because while they were not excommunicated, they also were not in full communion with the Catholic Church.

Comments on the Mass

In a July 2007 apostolic letter, Summorum Pontificum, Pope Benedict XVI authorized wider use of the traditional Mass, which had largely fallen out of use with the reforms of the Second Vatican Council and the introduction of the Mass of Paul VI, or Novus Ordo. Restoration of all or some parts of the traditional Mass have been supported by Burke as part of a "reform of the reform", modifying what he sees as deficiencies in the implementation of the newer Mass of Paul VI. In 2012, Burke said the following regarding the liturgical changes that took place after the council:

Burke referred to Summorum Pontificum as "the most splendid contribution of the pontificate of Pope Benedict XVI". Over the years, Burke has frequently offered the traditional form of the Mass, including regularly performing ordinations for the ICKSP and the Priestly Fraternity of Saint Peter, both traditionalist groups whose priests offer only the older form of the Mass.

On March 2, 2011, Burke said that too many priests and bishops treat violations of liturgical norms as something that is unimportant, when they are actually "serious abuses" that damage the faith of Catholics. He criticized a perceived lack of reverence in the way the modern liturgy is sometimes conducted, stating "If we err by thinking we are the center of the liturgy, the Mass will lead to a loss of faith." In a 2015 interview, Burke reiterated his concern that man has become center of Mass, saying that "In many places the Mass became very priest‑centered, it was like the 'priest show.' This type of abuse leads to a loss of the sense of the sacred, taking the essential mystery out of the Mass. The reality of Christ Himself coming down on the altar to make present His sacrifice on Calvary gets lost." Burke blamed modernization of the liturgy after the Second Vatican Council for declining Mass attendance. "In some cases it actually became hard for people to bear because of illicit insertions, foreign agendas, and imposition of the personalities of priests and congregations into the liturgy to the point that people began to think that the Mass was some sort of social activity...If one understands what the Mass truly is — Christ Himself coming down from Heaven to renew the sacrifice of Calvary — how could you possibly not be there on Sunday?" he asked.

Burke condemned Traditionis custodes, a July 2021 motu proprio issued by Pope Francis which effectively reversed Summorum Pontificum by placing limits on priests offering the Traditional Form of the Mass. He said that he could not understand the document's assertion that the Novus Ordo form represented the "unique expression" of the Roman Rite of the Mass, because the Traditional Form "is a living form of the Roman Rite and has never ceased to be so". While Francis described the Traditional Mass as something that had become a tool to promote schism, Burke said that he had not seen such tendencies in practice. He alleged that the Pope's document was "marked by harshness" towards those who attend Mass in the older form and criticized the fact that it took effect immediately, which in his view did not give adequate time for those affected to study its meaning. Burke stated that Pope Francis did not have the authority to eliminate the Traditional Mass.

Antinomianism
The 2012 Synod of Bishops meeting focused on "The New Evangelization". In written comments to the synod, Burke criticized "antinomianism", the belief that grace exempts Christians from obedience to moral law, stating that it is "among the most serious wounds of society today," and is responsible for the legalization of "intrinsically evil" actions such as abortion, embryonic stem-cell research, euthanasia, and same-sex marriage.

Islam and immigration
In a 2016 interview, Burke said there is "no question that Islam wants to govern the world" and that he feared "being forcibly under an Islamic government". In his subsequent book, Hope for the World: To Unite All Things in Christ, Burke says:

Archbishop Diarmuid Martin of Dublin said that Burke's remarks were unhelpful at a time when Europe was still wavering in the aftermath of a series of terror attacks.

Before the 2016 United States presidential election, Burke met with Steve Bannon, a close advisor to Donald Trump. The pair met several more times, and Burke was for years a strong ally of Bannon. In 2013, he was named president of the board of advisers to Bannon's Dignitatis Humanae Institute, an academy set up by Bannon to train right-wing Catholic activists. In 2019, however, Burke resigned from the board and cut ties with Bannon because of the latter's stated intent to make a film adaptation of Frederic Martel's work In the Closet of the Vatican, saying that "I disagree completely with a number of Mr. Bannon's statements regarding the doctrine and discipline of the Roman Catholic Church."

In February 2017, after Trump became president, Burke said that he did not "think the new president [would] be inspired by hatred in his treatment of the issue of immigration." In 2017, Burke met with the right-wing Italian nationalist Matteo Salvini, head of Italy's Northern League and an opponent of Pope Francis on immigration and dialogue with Muslims.

In 2018, Burke condemned the family separation policy of the Trump administration, saying, "A solution to the situation has to be found which avoids this practice of separating small children from their parents, that’s clear."

In May 2019, Burke said that "to resist large-scale Muslim immigration in my judgment is to be responsible" and "a responsible exercise of one’s patriotism"; he cited a book called No Go Zones: How Sharia Law is Coming to a Neighborhood Near You, by former Breitbart News reporter Raheem Kassam, in support of his contention that immigration of Muslims to Europe and the U.S. was harmful. Burke said that Muslim immigration was because Christians were "no longer ready to defend the moral law" and expressed fears of demographic shift because "Christians are not reproducing themselves."

Clergy sex abuse
In 2018, Burke described ongoing sex abuse scandals in the church as "an apostasy from the faith". He added that "principally, it starts with the idea that there can be legitimate sexual activity outside of marriage, which of course is false, completely false". Burke called for prayer and acts of reparation in the midst of the crisis. In 2019, Burke said that "lay faithful who are well-prepared" in dealing with sexual abuse cases "should be called upon to investigate and help get to the bottom of" the church's clergy abuse problem, while also stating that any group of people investigating abuse cases must ultimately report and answer to the pope.

In 2019, Burke was reported to have received, together with other influential U.S. Catholic leaders, substantial monetary gifts from West Virginia bishop Michael J. Bransfield, who had resigned following allegations of sexual misconduct. The gifts had been reimbursed by the diocese. Burke said that the gifts that he received were "generous" but "not lavish," and that he had used them to make charitable donations.

COVID-19
Burke has criticized global responses related to the COVID-19 pandemic. Referring to it as "the mysterious Wuhan virus", he said that the virus is being used by "certain forces ... to advance their evil agenda" and to force people to become "subjects of the so-called 'Great Reset,' the 'new normal,' which is dictated to us by their manipulation of citizens and nations through ignorance and fear."

Burke has raised objections to COVID-19 vaccination. He has denounced vaccine mandates and compared them to "state-mandated microchipping". Burke stated that the setting of vaccine mandates "violates the integrity of" citizens. In December 2020, referring to COVID-19 vaccine development, Burke said that the use of fetal tissue in vaccine development is "rightly abhorrent," saying it is "never morally justified to develop a vaccine through the use of the cell lines of aborted fetuses." The Vatican ruled 21 December 2020 that "when ethically irreproachable Covid-19 vaccines are not available (e.g. in countries where vaccines without ethical problems are not made available to physicians and patients, or where their distribution is more difficult due to special storage and transport conditions, or when various types of vaccines are distributed in the same country but health authorities do not allow citizens to choose the vaccine with which to be inoculated) it is morally acceptable to receive Covid-19 vaccines that have used cell lines from aborted fetuses in their research and production process." Burke has also criticized social distancing.

In August 2021, Burke announced he had tested positive for COVID-19; he was hospitalized and placed on a ventilator for several days. On August 28, Burke said that he had been transferred out of the intensive care unit and that his health condition was improving. On September 26, Burke announced that he been moved from the hospital and was making slow but steady progress in his rehabilitation from COVID-19 and he hoped to be able to resume normal duties in several weeks.

Honors
During his tenure in Saint Louis, Burke was awarded honorary doctorates in humane letters by two US Catholic universities, Ave Maria University in 2005, and Christendom College in 2007.

Archbishop Robert James Carlson of St. Louis created the Raymond Leo Cardinal Burke Chair in Canon Law at St. Louis's Kenrick-Glennon Seminary. In May 2011, the Franciscan University of Steubenville awarded Burke an honorary doctorate.

Selected works
Lack of discretion of judgment because of schizophrenia: doctrine and recent rotal jurisprudence, Doctoral Dissertation, (Rome: Pontificia Università Gregoriana, 1986). See also "Defectus discretionis iudicii propter schizophreniam: Doctrina et recens iurisprudentia," Periodica, 73 (1984): 555–570; and "Lack of Discretion of Judgment: Canonical Doctrine and Legislation," in The Jurist, 45 (1985): 171–209.
"Canon 1095, 1° and 2°," in Incapacity for marriage: Jurisprudence and Interpretation, Acts of the III Gregorian Collguium, Robert M. Sable, coordinator and editor (Rome: Pontificia Università Gregoriana, 1987).
"La procedura amministrativa per la dichiarazione di nullità del matrimonio," in I procedimenti speciali nel diritto canonico, Studi giuridici 27 (Vatican City: Libreria editrice Vaticana, 1992), 93–105.
"Il processo di dispensa dal matrimonio rato e non consummato: la grazia pontificia e la sua natura," in I procedimenti speciali nel diritto canonico, Studi giuridici 27 (Vatican City: Libreria editrice Vaticana, 1992), 135–144.
"The Application of Canon 1095 and sacramental-pastoral activity concerning marriage," in Ius in vita et in missione Ecclesiæ, Acta Symposii internationalis iuris canonici occurrente X anniversario promulgationis Codicis iuris canonici diebus 19–24 aprilis 1993 in Civitate Vaticana celebrati, Pontificia Concilium de legum textibus interpretandis (Vatican City: Libreria editrice Vaticana, 1994), 1095–1102.
"The Distinction of Personnel in Hierarchically Related Tribunals," in Studia canonica, 28 (1994): 85–98.
"Canon 1421: The Nullity of a Decision by a Single Lay Judge," [1994] in Arthur J. Espelage, OFM (ed.), CLSA Advisory Opinions 1994–2000 (Washington, DC: CLSA, 2002), 451–452.
"Canons 1421–1422 and 1435–1436: The Exercise of the Office of Judge or Defender of the Bond by a Priest on Leave of Absence from Priestly Ministry," [1995, co-authored with Joseph R. Punderson] in Arthur J. Espelage, OFM (ed.), CLSA Advisory Opinions 1994–2000 (Washington, DC: CLSA, 2002), 453–454.
"La "confessio iudicialis" e le dichiarizioni giudiziali delle parti," in I mezzi di prova nelle cause matrimoniali secondo la giurisprudenza rotale, Studi Giuridici XXXVIII (Vatican City: Libreria editrice Vaticana, 1995), 15–30.
"Commentary on the July 12, 1993, Decree of the Apostolic Signatura relating to the qualifications of advocates," in Canadian Canon Law Society Newsletter, 21 (1996): 9–13; for Spanish translation see: "Abogados, uniones matrimoniales irregulares y causas de nulidad matrimonial: Texto y comentario de una Respuesta de Tribunal Supremo de la Signatura Apostolica," in REDC, 51 (1994): 639–645.
"Canon Law at the Service of the New Evangelization," given on the occasion of receiving the Role of Law Award from the Canon Law Society of America, in Canon Law Society of America Proceedings, 62 (2000): 497–500; introductory remarks of gratitude, 495–496.
"On Our Civic Responsibility for the Common Good," (Saint Louis: Archdiocese of Saint Louis, 2004).
"Canon 915: The Discipline Regarding the Denial of Holy Communion to Those Obstinately Persevering in Manifest Grave Sin," in Periodica, 96 (2007): 3–58.

See also
 Catholic Church in the United States
 Hierarchy of the Catholic Church
 List of Catholic bishops in the United States

References

External links

 

1948 births
Living people
People from Richland Center, Wisconsin
Writers from Missouri
Writers from Wisconsin
Religious leaders from Wisconsin
Roman Catholic bishops of La Crosse
American Roman Catholic clergy of Irish descent
Roman Catholic archbishops of St. Louis
21st-century American cardinals
Clergy from St. Louis
Catholic University of America alumni
Catholic University of America trustees
Pontifical Gregorian University alumni
Prefects of the Apostolic Signatura
20th-century Roman Catholic bishops in the United States
Cardinals created by Pope Benedict XVI
Pontifical North American College alumni
Members of the Congregation for the Clergy
Members of the Congregation for Bishops
Members of the Congregation for Divine Worship and the Discipline of the Sacraments
Members of the Congregation for the Causes of Saints
Patrons of the Sovereign Military Order of Malta
Canon law jurists
Knights of the Holy Sepulchre
People from Stratford, Wisconsin
American traditionalist Catholics
Traditionalist Catholic writers